Angren may refer to:
 Angren, Uzbekistan, town near Tashkent, Uzbekistan 
 Angren River, river in Tashkent Province of Uzbekistan
 River Isen, a fictional river in Middle-earth, also called Angren
 Ngamring County, pinyin Angren, county in Tibet